Nazli Moawad is an Egyptian political science professor at Faculty of Political Science at Cairo University. She was granted the National Legion of Honour (Chevalier d’honneur), the highest French honor, by France’s President.

References

Academic staff of Cairo University
Grand Officiers of the Légion d'honneur
Living people
Year of birth missing (living people)